Face2Face is the fifth studio album from R&B singer Babyface. It was released by Nu America and Arista Records on September 11, 2001, in the United States. His first album in five years after 1996's The Day, it also marked Babyface's first album with Arista, which reunited him with his former songwriting and production partner L.A. Reid who was the president of the label at the time of the album's release.

The album was a radical departure from his previous works, as the balladeer was focused on more uptempo songs. 
Face2Face was also different due to Babyface working with outside producers on roughly half of the album. Producers on the album included Tim & Bob, Heavy D, The Neptunes, Diggin' in the Crates producer Buckwild, Brian McKnight's associate producer Anthony Nance and Dan Reed Network member Brion James.

Reviews of the album were mixed, as critics and fans did not know what to make of Babyface's new musical direction. Face2Face is notable for being one of a few albums released on the same day as the September 11 attacks. It was released alongside other recordings such as Slayer's God Hates Us All, Jay-Z's The Blueprint, Dream Theater's Live Scenes from New York, Mariah Carey's Glitter, Fabolous's Ghetto Fabolous and Nickelback's Silver Side Up.

Critical reception

Allmusic editor Stephen Thomas Erlewine called Face2Face "a gleaming, stylish platter of urban funk and smooth soul that is easily among his very best records [...] Though he's dabbled in funk since the beginning of his career, the grooves here cut deeper and are flashier than ever before, and the sweet croon of his voice just makes them seem deeper. Then there are the ballads that he's always excelled at – they're just as good here, but they not only offer good contrast, they sound better in this context, surrounded by such exquisite dance numbers and grooves [...] Babyface has never been in better form, and from beginning to end, this record captures him at the peak of his powers."

Track listing

Personnel
Credits adapted from the album's liner notes.

 Keyboard programming – Babyface, The Neptunes, Mike City, Megahertz, Heavy D, Anthony Nance, Brion James, Tim Kelley 
 Drum programming – Tim Kelley, Anthony Nance, Buckwild, The Neptunes, Mike City
 Bass – Babyface
 Acoustic guitar – Babyface
 Electric guitar – Babyface, Bob Robinson, Brion James
 Wurlitzer and Fender Rhodes – Wayne Lindsey
 Hammond B-3 organ – Bob Robinson
 Background vocals – Babyface, Mike City, Pharrell Williams, Latrelle Simmons
 Recording – Paul Boutin, Brian Garten
 Mixing – Jean Marie Horvat, Josean Posey, Edward Quesada, Derek Carlson
 Executive producer – Antonio "L.A." Reid
 Photography – Christian Lantry, Sante D'Orazio
 Art direction, design – Gravillis, Inc.

Charts

Weekly charts

Year-end charts

Certifications

References

Babyface (musician) albums
2001 albums
Albums produced by the Neptunes
Albums produced by Tim & Bob
Albums produced by Babyface (musician)
Neo soul albums